The ninth season of Let's Dance started on 11 March 2016. Sylvie Meis and Daniel Hartwich returned as hosts while Motsi Mabuse, Joachim Llambi and Jorge Gonzalez also returned as the judges. This also served as the second season to feature 14 couples.

Couples

Scoring chart

Red numbers indicates the lowest score for each week.
Green numbers indicates the highest score for each week.
 indicates the couple eliminated that week.
 indicates the returning couple that finished in the bottom two.
 indicates the couple that withdrew from the competition.
 indicates the couple was eliminated but later returned to the competition.
 indicates the winning couple.
 indicates the runner-up couple.
 indicates the third-place couple.

Averages 
This table only counts for dances scored on a traditional 30-points scale.

Highest and lowest scoring performances 
The best and worst performances in each dance according to the judges' marks are as follows:

Couples' Highest and lowest scoring performances
According to the traditional 30-point scale.

Weekly scores and songs

Week 1: Opening Night 

Running order

Week 2 

Running order

Week 3: 80's Night 
On March 31, Franziska Traub withdrew from the competition due to an injury. Actually Niels Ruf should fill in for her due to the rules but because of his behaviour during the show and afterwards it was decided that Ulli Potofski filled in for Traub.

Running order

Week 4: 90's Night
On April 4 it was announced that Vadim Garbuzov will be Sonja Kirchberger's partner from now on after Ilia Russo injured his back and had to leave the competition. Also this week featured a "Boys vs Girls Battle" dance where the male pro dancers and celebrities danced against the female pro dancers and celebrities. The judges then decided which group performance was the better one.
Running order

Week 5
On April 13 it was announced that Julius Brink won't perform at Friday because he is injured (groin strain). He is automatically saved and will perform next week.
Running order

Week 6: Movie Night
On April 20 it was announced that Victoria Swarovski won't perform at Friday because of a death in her family. She is automatically saved and will perform next week.

Running order

Week 7: Team Dances Night 

Running order

Week 8: Around the World Night 

Running order

Week 9: One Hit Wonder Night 
This week featured no bottom group instead Potofski was announced to be eliminated at the beginning of the results announcement.
Running order

Week 10: Fusion Night 
This week each couple performed a non learned dance and the second dance was a fusion dance, consisting out of two different dances.

Running order

Week 11: Semi-Final
For the second time every semi-finalist learned three individual dances while the third dance was an "impro dance" which means that the celebrities got the music only 20 minutes before they've performed. They didn't know the dance style and their costumes either.

Running order

Week 12: Final

Running order

Encore performances by the eliminated couples

Dance chart
 Highest scoring dance
 Lowest scoring dance
 Did not scored (encore performance in the finale)
 The pair did not perform this week
 Withdrew from the competition

Notes

References

External links
 Official website

Let's Dance (German TV series)
2016 German television seasons